Jesus Youth (JY) is an International Catholic Movement, approved by the Holy See. The Movement evolved as an outcome of the Charismatic revival that spread across India in the mid-1970s. JY had its beginnings in Kerala, India, and evolved as an active part of the Catholic Charismatic Renewal of the state in the late 1970s. In 1985, the International Year of Youth, a number of youth groups came together under a single name, Jesus Youth. Gradually, it spread to different parts of India and to a number of other countries. On 20 May 2016, it was granted recognition by the Vatican as an international private association of the faithful with juridical personality. The movement follows a lifestyle modelled on the life of Jesus Christ, based on what it calls 'six pillars', namely, personal prayer, Bible reading, Sacraments, fellowship, evangelization and "option for the poor"(Almsgiving.)

History
JY had its beginnings in Kerala, India, and evolved as an active part of the Catholic Charismatic Renewal of the state in the late 1970s. In 1985 it spread to different parts of India and to a number of other countries. On August 20, 2007, the Catholic Bishops’ Conference of India recognized Jesus Youth as a national association of the faithful on October 29, 2008.

On 29 October 2008, Jesus Youth received approval from the Catholic Bishops' Conference of India (CBCI) and Archbishop Abraham Viruthakulangara was appointed as the Ecclesiastical Advisor.  The process of being recognized as an ‘International Private Association of Christian Faithful of Pontifical Right’, with juridical personality in Canon Law officially began on 24 August 2009 with the Pontifical Council for the Laity. Approval was granted on 6 April 2016.

Identity 

Jesus Youth is an international private association of the faithful of all states of life, with juridical personality, governed by the present statutes in conformity with canons 298 - 311 and 321 - 326 of the Code of Canon Law. The progress of a Jesus Youth is ensured through a lifestyle of spiritual discipline of the association called six pillars. Jesus Youth carries out the work of evangelization by fostering individual apostolates, facilitating group apostolates and engaging in formal missions and projects in various parts of the world.

Jesus Youth Logo 
The J and Y in the Jesus Youth logo represent a young person and the risen Christ. The circle stands for the world where the youth are firmly rooted, receive graces and then pass it on.

Organization 

Jesus Youth is organized on a geographical basis with areas governed by Jesus Youth Councils. Local households are coordinated by the Zonal or Regional Council. Zonal Councils are coordinated by a Regional Council. The National Councils coordinate the Regional Councils. The National Councils are accountable to the International Council. The council is elected for a period of three years. A Jesus Youth Region usually coincides with an Ecclesiastical Region (canon 433 (CIC)). The higher council demarcates and forms a Region considering the number of Jesus Youth members in that area. A Regional Council governs the association in the Region and the National Council governs the association in the country. When the Ecclesiastical Region covers several countries, each country can have a National Council. The organs of governance of the association are personal and collegial. The personal ones are the Coordinator, Assistant Coordinator and Finance Coordinator. The collegial ones are the Councils, and the Assemblies. At each level the association is governed by the Council elected by the respective Assembly.

Membership 

Jesus Youth is currently present in 30 countries. There are 3 categories of membership in Jesus Youth: Regular Members, Associate Members and Honorary Members. Regular Members are Catholic faithful from all states of life: clergy, religious and laity, and include deacons, seminarians and celibates for the Kingdom. They are those in the Committed, Confirmed and Covenant Phases of the formation. Associate Members are those who desire to accompany the association, but are unable to fulfil the requirements of Regular membership (Art. 14). They undergo a period of formation before becoming Associate Members. They do not participate in the governing councils of the association. Catholics and non-Catholic Christians can become Associate Members. Honorary Members are Catholic bishops who accompany and advise the association. The International Council, in consultation with the Ecclesiastical Advisor of the International Council, confirms the honorary membership. Honorary Members will be invitees to the International Assembly and their respective National Assemblies. Non-Christians may become part of Jesus Youth prayer groups and attend the first two phases of formation, namely, Contact and Companion Phases, but cannot become members of the association.

Works 

Cell groups, Small groups and Prayer encourage young people and families to come together regularly for prayer and fellowship. Service teams co-ordinates teams at different levels consist of a Co-ordinator, a Pastor, one or more Animator/s and members. Faith formation is for the personal growth of members, in addition to the regular fellowship groups, there is a wide range of formation programmes in the Jesus Youth Movement - Jesus Youth Fulltime Volunteers, History Makers, Discipleship Training Programmes (DTP), Master Builders, Junior Evangelisers Training (JET). Formation for leaders and animators are offered at National and International Leaders’ Training and National and International Animators’ Training. Jesus Youth ministries include Parish Ministry, Teens Ministry, Professionals Ministry, Nurses Ministry, Campus Ministry. The Backbone of all Jesus Youth activities are Intercession ministry and  Finance ministry. Talent oriented formation include The Rex Band, Music Ministry, Audio visual Ministry, Media Ministry and Exhibition Ministry. Formation through reach out programmes include Outreach Ministry, Prolife Ministry, Cultural Exchange Programme (CEP), and Exposure programmes. Jesus Youth also organises numerous mission experience trips by parish youth, professionals and others. Regional, national and inter-continental conferences, Campus Meet, Nurses’ Meet, Teens’ Meet, etc. play a vital role in training youth to be active in their Christian life and witness.

The Six Pillars
The Jesus Youth movement is known for its spirituality that promotes an active Catholic lifestyle that is relevant to a young layperson facing the challenges of today. The Jesus Youth Movement is based on Six "Pillars of Spirituality" including:
 Personal Prayer
Word of God - Reading and meditating the Holy Scripture.
Sacramental Life - Frequent and active participation in the seven Sacraments, with emphasis on the Eucharist and Confession
Fellowship
Evangelization
Option for the Poor

Ministries
Jesus Youth ministries are founded on a firm spiritual basis and flourish in the context of growing fellowships. The formation teams gather together to develop the ministry and engage in the apostolate, provide mutual support and promote spiritual growth.

With the vision of sharing the faith and building a witnessing community, Jesus Youth has developed various ministries for its members. A Jesus Youth ministry is usually the initiative of an individual or a small fellowship, and normally tries to share Jesus in a particular context, using one's talent or charism. These initiatives gradually grow into ministries of Jesus Youth. While helping young people to come together and grow in fellowship, these ministries also prepare youth to embrace the Gospel in their daily life and to proclaim the Gospel to others.

Each ministry has a co-ordinating team and a set of formation and outreach programmes. In Jesus Youth there are a number of ministries focusing on different areas such as: i) Formation, ii) The context of life, iii) Talent and iv) Outreach

Jesus Youth ministries include:
Theatre Ministry
Media Ministry
Campus Ministry
Arts and Science College Ministry
Teens Ministry
Nurses Ministry
Kids Ministry
Doctors Ministry
Prolife Ministry
Professional Ministry
Parish Ministry
Intercession Ministry
Outreach Ministry
Medical Engineering Students Ministry
Music Ministry
Family Ministry
Street Ministry
Nallaayalkkaran is a God given dynamism for Jesus Youth to be present in the secular world as a face of God`s mercy and sign of goodness in collaboration with all other realities in the society.

Full time volunteers

Jesus Youth Fulltimership is a year-long formation program for graduates with 40 days of training and one-year full-time missionary commitment to work in different parts of the world.

After 40 days of intensive training, they are commissioned for a one-year formation through a missionary placement.

It started in 1991 when a Jesus Youth got an inner call to commit life completely for one year to be a missionary in Jesus Youth movement. He left behind his academics and career for the service of the Lord. After consultation of the inner plan with the leaders and elders of the movement he launched himself into this new journey, visiting places, touching the lives of people and challenging young minds in campuses and parishes across the Indian state of Kerala.

The Rexband
The Rexband is the musical outreach of Jesus Youth. The band has performed widely across India and in many parts of the world over the last 20 years. It has also brought out a dozen albums. It was the first band from India to be invited by the Pope to perform for the World Youth Day.

The signature sound of the band is a fusion of contemporary pop and Indian classical music. This mix has naturally evolved from the potpourri of musicians including Hindustani, Carnatic, pop, rock and hip hop. This diversity makes it quite difficult to pin down a specific style of music to the band. The essence of the band's centers on contemporary popular music with an unmistakable ethnic Indian flavour.

In the late 80s and early 90s, the band was formed by a group of young musicians from diverse musical environments ranging from contemporary pop to ethnic Indian music. The name ‘Rexband’ comes from the Latin phrase 'Christus Rex’, meaning "Christ the King". The band has travelled to more than 15 countries across Europe, Asia, Australia and the United States.

Publications 

 Kairos (Monthly Magazine)
 Kairos Global (Monthly Magazine)
 Jesus Youth Newsletter (Quarterly Magazine)
 Rex Band (Music)
 Sing Halleluia
 Jesus Youth Prayers
 Philip and Paul, Emmaus I and II, Emmaus III and IV (Formation Materials)
 Masterplan (Music)
 Crosstoc  (Music)

References

External links
Jesus Youth Official Website

Catholic youth organizations
International associations of the faithful